Tallow is a town, civil parish and townland in County Waterford, Ireland. Tallow is in the province of Munster near the border between County Cork and County Waterford and situated on a small hill just south of the River Bride.

History
Some records indicate that there was a church at Tallow, possibly of pre-Anglo-Norman foundation, from at least the 12th century. Lisfinny Castle, a 15-century tower house constructed by the Earl of Desmond, overlooks the town.

Early records show that Tallow was a centre for iron smelting, and the town's original Irish name, Tulach an Iarainn, translates as "hill of the iron" in English. From the early 17th century, Richard Boyle, 1st Earl of Cork reportedly planted a number of Protestant English families in the Tallow area and developed the iron industry on a "large[er] scale". By 1659 the "Old Forge" area of the town had 51 inhabitants.

Tallow also became a centre for grain export, downriver to Youghal. Wool combing also took place locally during the 18th century. During the mid-19th century, the Great Famine hit the town and surrounding area hard, leading to a decline in population.

Before the Act of Union (Ireland) 1800, Tallow was the centre of a constituency of the same name in the Irish House of Commons from 1613 until the dissolution of the Kingdom of Ireland in 1800. During the Land War in 1887, Douglas Pyne, MP for West Waterford, imprisoned himself here after a warrant was issued for his arrest. After receiving thousands of supporters from Tallow and the surrounding area, he escaped by slipping through a police cordon.

Government
Tallow is located in the Lismore local electoral area of Waterford City and County Council. Two county councillors from Tallow were elected at the 2019 local elections: John Pratt (Labour) and James Tobin (Fianna Fáil).

Amenities

Tallow has a number of public houses and restaurants, clustered on the Main Street. There are two supermarkets; Keniry's Centra and Forde's Spar. The town's library, which was opened as a Carnegie library in 1910, is one of several overseen by Waterford City and County Council. Other business include a barbers, pharmacy, veterinarian, co-op store, antiques shop and a café.

Religion
The Roman Catholic Parish of Tallow centres on the Church of the Immaculate Conception on Chapel Street, built in 1826. It is the tallest building in the town.

St Catherine's Church of Ireland on Mill Road, was built in 1775 but closed in the 1960s due to falling numbers of parishioners. The nearest Anglican church is St Mary's, Fountains, 7 km east in the townland of Kilanthony.

Sports
Tallow GAA play at Pairc Eamonn De Paor on the outskirts of the town and field Hurling teams in County and Provincial competitions. The town also has a soccer club, Brideview United AFC, who compete in the West Waterford East Cork League.

Fishing and horse racing are also local sports, and the Tallow Horse Fair is held annually at the beginning of September.

Transport

The town lies at the junction of the R627, R628 and R634 regional roads.

Tallow Road railway station opened on 27 September 1872, located on the Waterford–Mallow railway line. It closed on 27 March 1967. It was served by the Cork to Rosslare boat train.

As of 2022, Tallow is served primarily by two Local Link (formerly Déise Link) bus services. The 363 route links Tallow to Dungarvan via Lismore and Cappoquin, running twelve times a day each way Monday to Saturday and four times a day on Sundays and bank holidays. The 364 route links Tallow to Fermoy via Curraglass, Conna, Bridesbridge and Castlelyons, running three times a day each way Monday to Saturday. Less frequent services that require pre-booking link Tallow to Youghal.

Education
Tallow has a national school called Scoil Mhuire which is used by around 140 children. The town also has an enterprise centre used by several local organisations including the Senior Citizens' Group. The nearest secondary school is Blackwater Community School in nearby Lismore, County Waterford

People 

At the St Patrick's Parish Hall a number of people from Tallow are commemorated:
 John Hogan (1800–1858), a sculptor who was responsible for "much of the most significant religious sculpture in Ireland" during the 19th century, was born in Tallow
 Tobias Kirby (1804–1895), rector of the Irish College Rome (1850-1891) and archbishop of Ephesus (1885), was also born in Tallow.
 Frank Ryan (1900–1965), tenor, grew up in Tallow.

See also
 List of towns and villages in Ireland

References

External links 

 Tallow Enterprise Centre
 E. M. P. Beecher Cantillon: Tallow : An Outline History

Towns and villages in County Waterford
Civil parishes of County Waterford
Townlands of County Waterford